Georgia competed at the 2008 Summer Olympics in Beijing, People's Republic of China. This is a list of the results of all of the athletes who qualified for the Olympics and were nominated by Georgian National Olympic Committee. Georgia was represented in the 2008 Beijing Olympic Games by 35 sportsmen and sportswomen in total of 11 different sporting events. The Games had a dramatic start for Georgia, as well as for Russia, due to the onset of the 2008 South Ossetia war at the very start of the Games. Georgian athletes won three gold, two silver, and three bronze medals during the games.

Medalists

Archery

Georgia sent archers to the Olympics for the fourth time, seeking its first Olympic medal in the sport. Khatuna Narimanidze and Kristine Esebua (both veterans of the 2004 Olympics) earned the nation two spots in the women's competition by placing 5th and 30th in the women's individual competition at the 2007 Outdoor World Target Championships.

Athletics 

Men

Women

Boxing

Georgia qualified two boxers for the Olympic boxing tournament.  Both boxers qualified at the second European continental qualifying tournament.

Gymnastics

Artistic
Men

Trampoline

Judo 

Men

Shooting

On 10 August 2008, Nino Salukvadze made international headlines as she kissed and hugged with Russian silver medalist Natalia Paderina after the 10m air pistol medal ceremony while Georgia and Russia were fighting over South Ossetia.

Women

Swimming

Men

Women

Volleyball

Beach
Both Georgian teams were composed of Brazilians who became Georgian citizens to compete in Olympic beach volleyball. The players' nicknames echoed the name of the country, the men in English ("Geor and "Gia"), and the women in Georgian ("Saka" and "Rtvelo").  Beach volleyball proved to be the most notable moment for the Georgian team when their women defeated Russian opponents.  The added notability to this game stemmed from the military conflict with Russia over South Ossetia.

The men were ranked seventeenth, and were playing in Pool C against pairs from Brazil, Australia and Angola. The women are ranked 23rd in the Olympic qualifying rankings, and were the last team to earn entry from the rankings list. They were playing in Pool C against pairs from Brazil, Australia and Russia.

Weightlifting

 Arsen Kasabiev originally finished fourth, but in January 2017, he was promoted to second place due to two disqualifications.

Wrestling

Men's freestyle

 Giorgi Gogshelidze originally finished third, but in November 2016, he was promoted to second place due to disqualification of Taimuraz Tigiyev.

Men's Greco-Roman

References 

Nations at the 2008 Summer Olympics
2008
Summer Olympics